A by-election for the Brisbane City Council ward of Morningside was held on 20 January 2018, triggered by the resignation of incumbent Labor councillor, Shayne Sutton.

Background
Shayne Sutton announced her intention to retire as the Councillor for Morningside Ward on Monday 23 October 2017, saying she would stay on "until the state election", assuming the election would be at the start of 2018 and that the by-election could coincide, however, just six days later, Queensland Premier Annastacia Palaszczuk called the election for 25 November 2017

The Electoral Commission of Queensland announced on 2 November 2017, that the By-Election would take place on 20 January 2018.

Key dates
 Saturday 16 December 2017 – Issue of writ
 Thursday 21 December 2017 – Close of electoral rolls (2pm)
 Tuesday 2 January 2018 – Close of nominations (12 noon)
 Tuesday 2 January 2018 – Ballot Draw (2:30PM)
 Monday 8 January 2018 – Start of early voting
 Saturday 20 January 2018 – Polling day (8am to 6pm)
 Tuesday 30 January 2018 – Last day for receipt of postal votes

Results

See also
2016 Brisbane City Council election

References

Brisbane City Council elections